KCLS may refer to:

 KCLS (defunct), a defunct radio station in Flagstaff, Arizona, United States
 KCLS (FM), a radio station (101.5 FM) in Leeds, Utah, United States
 King County Library System, a library system in King County, Washington, United States
 Chehalis-Centralia Airport's ICAO code for the airport in Washington state